Mohammadabad (also Romanized as Moḩammadābād) is a village in Mosaferabad Rural District, Rudkhaneh District, Rudan County, Hormozgan Province, Iran. At the 2006 census, its population was 363, in 78 families.

References 

Populated places in Rudan County